Robert Mortimer (1927-2007) was an American molecular biologist who was a pioneer of introducing single-celled yeasts as a model organism to study the operation of genes and chromosomes.

Mortimer was a professor of molecular and cell biology at the University of California, Berkeley. His service to the field was recognized with the George W. Beadle Award in 2002.

Mortimer died on August 10, 2007, in Berkeley, California at age 79.

References

American molecular biologists
University of California, Berkeley faculty
1927 births
2007 deaths